Chupakhivka is an urban-type settlement in Okhtyrka Raion of Sumy Oblast in Ukraine. It is located on the banks of the Tashan in the drainage basin of the Dnieper. Chupakhivka hosts the administration of Chupakhivka settlement hromada, one of the hromadas of Ukraine. Population:

Economy

Transportation
This is a terminal station with infrequent passenger traffic.

Chupakhivka is connected by road with Okhtyrka and Lebedyn.

References

Urban-type settlements in Okhtyrka Raion
Lebedinsky Uyezd